Jankauskas is a Lithuanian surname. Notable people with the surname include:

Algis Jankauskas (born 1982), Lithuanian footballer
Edgaras Jankauskas (born 1975),  Lithuanian footballer and manager
Eligijus Jankauskas (born 1998), Lithuanian footballer
Vladas Jankauskas (cyclist) (1903–69), Lithuanian cyclist
Vladas Jankauskas (painter) (1923–83), Lithuanian painter

Lithuanian-language surnames